A chronicle is a historical account of facts and events ranged in chronological order.

Chronicle may also refer to:

Companies
 Chronicle (company), a cybersecurity company owned by Alphabet Inc.
 Chronicle Books, a San Francisco-based book publisher, formerly a subsidiary of Chronicle Publishing Company
 Chronicle Publishing Company, a San Francisco-based publishing & media company

Film and TV 
 Chronicle (film), a 2012 American film
 Chronicle (U.S. TV program), a 1982–date newsmagazine program
 Chronicle (UK TV programme), a 1966–1991 archaeology programme

Music 
 Chronicle (Lights & Motion album), a 2015 album by Swedish band Lights & Motion 
  Chronicle (Chicago Underground Trio album), a 2007 album by the Chicago Underground Trio
 Chronicle, Vol. 1, a 1976 album by Creedence Clearwater Revival
 Chronicle, Vol. 2, a 1986 album by Creedence Clearwater Revival

Other uses 
 Chronicle (ballet), a ballet choreographed by Martha Graham to music by Wallingford Riegger

See also
 Chess Player's Chronicle
 Chronicles (disambiguation)
 List of chronicles
 The Chronicle (disambiguation)
 :Category:Chronicles